Jae-joon, also spelled Jae-jun, is a Korean masculine given name. Its meaning depends on the hanja used to write each syllable of the name. There are 20 hanja with the reading "jae" and 34 hanja with the reading "joon" on the South Korean government's official list of hanja which may be registered for use in given names.

People with this name include:
Nam Jae-joon (born 1944), South Korean intelligence officer; see list of directors of the National Intelligence Service (South Korea) and predecessor organizations
Jaejun Yu (born 1962), South Korean physicist
Jeajoon Ryu (born 1970), South Korean composer
An Jae-jun (born 1986), South Korean footballer
Kim Jae-joong (born Han Jae-joon, 1986), South Korean singer
Lee Jae-joon (born 1990), South Korean actor and model
Lee Jae-joon (born 1997), stage name Maru, member of South Korean boyband C-Clown

Fictional characters with this name include:
Lee Jae-joon, in 2009 South Korean film My Girlfriend Is an Agent
Shin Jae-joon, in 2009 South Korean film Heaven's Postman
Jae-joon, in 2012 South Korean film The Grand Heist
Kim Jae-joon, in 2013 South Korean television series Good Doctor
Han Jae-joon, in 2014 South Korean television series Doctor Stranger
Jeon Jae-jun, in 2022 South Korean television series The Glory

See also
List of Korean given names

References

Korean masculine given names